Al-Shaheed Arkan Sport Club, is an Iraqi football team based in Diyala, that plays in Iraq Division Three.

Managerial history
 Hadi Mijbel

See also 
 2000–01 Iraqi Elite League

References

External links
 Iraq Clubs- Foundation Dates

1993 establishments in Iraq
Association football clubs established in 1993
Football clubs in Diyala